Abigail Reynolds may refer to:
 Abigail Reynolds (writer)
 Abigail Reynolds (artist)